Roberto DaMatta (born July 29, 1936) is a Brazilian anthropologist. He is an emeritus professor of anthropology at the University of Notre Dame. DaMatta graduated in history at the Fluminense Federal University and received his PhD from Harvard University.

DaMatta is the author of many books, including Carnivals, Rogues and Heroes: An Interpretation of the Brazilian Dilemma.

Selected works 
Carnavais, malandros e heróis: Para uma sociologia do dilema brasileiro, 1979.
Translated into English as Carnivals, Rogues, and Heroes: An Interpretation of the Brazilian Dilemma, University of Notre Dame Press, 1991.
A Divided World: Apinaye Social Structure, Harvard University Press, 1982.

See also
Jeitinho
Sérgio Buarque de Hollanda
Darcy Ribeiro

References

1936 births
Brazilian anthropologists
Living people
University of Notre Dame faculty
Brazilian columnists
People from Niterói
Harvard University alumni